The 2022–23 Taichung Suns season was the franchise's 2nd season, its second season in the T1 League, its 2nd in Taichung City. On July 1, 2022, the Taoyuan Pilots hired Iurgi Caminos, the head coach of the Taichung Wagor Suns, as their new head coach. On September 18, the Suns promoted Alberto Garcia, the assistant coach of the Taichung Wagor Suns, as their new head coach. On October 25, the Suns named Chris Gavina as their new head coach.

Draft 

 Reference：

The Suns' 2022 and 2023 second-round draft picks were traded to TaiwanBeer HeroBears in exchange for Chou Tzu-Hua.

Standings

Roster 

<noinclude>

Game log

2022 Interleague Play 
On September 13, 2022, Taichung Wagor Suns announced that Bayasgalan Delgerchuluun, Austin Derrick and Chang Chia-Jung joined to the team as the testing player in these invitational games.

Group match

Preseason 
Bayasgalan Delgerchuluun and Austin Derrick joined to the team as the testing player in these preseason games.

Regular season

Regular season note 
 Due to the Taichung Suns cannot reach the minimum player number, the T1 League declared that the game on January 14 would postpone.

Player Statistics 
<noinclude>

Regular season

 Reference：

Transactions 
On December 23, 2022, Taichung Suns registered Niño Canaleta as import player. On February 10, 2023, Taichung Suns cancelled the registration of Niño Canaleta's playership. On March 8, 2023, Taichung Suns registered Austin Derrick as import players, and cancelled the registration of Aaron Geramipoor's playership due to the injury.

Trades

Free agents

Re-signed

Additions

Subtractions

Awards

Import of the Month

All-Star Game Awards

References 

2022–23 T1 League season by team
Taichung Suns seasons